

Events

January 
 January 1 – Air India Flight 855, a Boeing 747 passenger jet, crashes off the coast of Bombay, killing 213.
 January 5 – Bülent Ecevit, of CHP, forms the new government of Turkey (42nd government).
 January 6 – The Holy Crown of Hungary (also known as Stephen of Hungary Crown) is returned to Hungary from the United States, where it was held since World War II.
 January 10 – Pedro Joaquín Chamorro Cardenal, a critic of the Nicaraguan government, is assassinated; riots erupt against Somoza's government.
 January 18 – The European Court of Human Rights finds the British government guilty of mistreating prisoners in Northern Ireland, but not guilty of torture.
 January 22 – Ethiopia declares the ambassador of West Germany persona non grata.
 January 24
 Soviet satellite Kosmos 954 burns up in Earth's atmosphere, scattering debris over Canada's Northwest Territories.
 Rose Dugdale and Eddie Gallagher become the first convicted prisoners to marry in prison since the establishment of the Republic of Ireland.
 January 25 – 27 – The Great Blizzard of 1978 strikes the Ohio Valley and Great Lakes, killing 70.

February 
 February 1 – Film director Roman Polanski skips bail and flees to France, after pleading guilty to charges of engaging in sex with a 13-year-old girl.
 February 5–7 – The Northeastern United States blizzard of 1978 hits the New England region and the New York metropolitan area, killing about 100, and causing over US$520 million in damage.
 February 6 – King Dragon operation in Arakan: Burmese General Ne Win targets Muslim minorities in the village of Sakkipara.
 February 8 – United States Senate proceedings are broadcast on radio for the first time.
 February 9 – The Budd Company unveils its first SPV-2000 self-propelled railcar in Philadelphia, Pennsylvania, United States.
 February 11
 Pacific Western Airlines Flight 314, a Boeing 737-200, crashes in Cranbrook, British Columbia, killing 44 of the 50 people on board.
 Somalia mobilizes its troops to deal with an apparent Ethiopian attack.
 The People's Republic of China lifts a ban on works by Aristotle, William Shakespeare and Charles Dickens.
 February 13 – Sydney Hilton Hotel bombing: A bomb explodes outside the Hilton Hotel in Sydney, Australia, killing a policeman and two civilians, and injuring several other people.
 February 15 – Rhodesia, one of only two remaining white-ruled African nations (the other being South Africa), announces that it will accept multiracial democracy within 2 years.
 February 19 – Egyptian raid on Larnaca International Airport: Egyptian Special Forces attempt to rescue several hostages in Larnaca, Cyprus; 20 Egyptian commandos are injured or killed.
 February 25 – The first Legislative Assembly election is held in Arunachal Pradesh, India.
 February 27 – The first global positioning satellite, the Rockwell International-built Navstar 1, is launched by the United States.

March 
 March 1 – Charlie Chaplin's remains are stolen from Cosier-sur-Vevey, Switzerland.
 March 2 – Soyuz 28 (Aleksei Gubarev, Vladimír Remek) is launched on a rendezvous with Salyut 6, with the first cosmonaut from a country other than the USA or USSR (Czechoslovakian Vladimír Remek).
 March 3
 Ethiopia admits that its troops are fighting with the aid of Cuban soldiers, against Somalian troops in the Ogaden.
 Rhodesia attacks Zambia.
 The New York Post publishes an article about David Rorvik's book The Cloning of Man, about a supposed cloning of a human being.
 March 8 – The first radio episode of The Hitchhiker's Guide to the Galaxy, by Douglas Adams, is transmitted on BBC Radio 4.
 March 10 – Soyuz 28 lands.
 March 11 – Coastal Road massacre: Palestinian terrorists kill 34 Israelis.
 March 14 – Operation Litani: Israeli forces invade Lebanon.
 March 15 – Somalia and Ethiopia sign a truce to end the Ethio-Somali War.
 March 16 – Former Italian Premier Aldo Moro is kidnapped by the Red Brigades; 5 bodyguards are killed.
 March 17 – An oil tanker, Amoco Cadiz, runs aground on the coast of Brittany.
 March 18
 Zulfikar Ali Bhutto, Prime Minister of Pakistan, is sentenced to death by hanging, for ordering the assassination of a political opponent.
 California Jam II is held at the Ontario Motor Speedway in Ontario, California, attracting more than 300,000 fans.
 March 22 – Karl Wallenda of The Flying Wallendas dies, after falling off a tight-rope between two hotels in San Juan, Puerto Rico.
 March 26 – The control tower and some other facilities of New Tokyo International Airport, which were scheduled to open on March 31, are illegally occupied and damaged in a terrorist attack by New Left activists, forcing a rescheduling of its opening date to May 20.
 March 28
 San Francisco's City Council signs the United States's most comprehensive gay rights bill.
 Stump v. Sparkman (435 U.S. 349): The Supreme Court of the United States hands down a 5–3 decision, in a controversial case involving involuntary sterilization and judicial immunity.

April 

 April 1
 New Zealand National Airways Corporation (the domestic airline of New Zealand) is merged with New Zealand's international airline, Air New Zealand.
 Dick Smith of Dick Smith Foods tows a fake iceberg to Sydney Harbour.
 The Philippine College of Commerce, through a presidential decree, is converted to the Polytechnic University of the Philippines.
 April 2 – Dallas debuts on CBS, and gives birth to the modern day primetime soap opera.
 April 3 – The 50th Academy Awards are held at the Dorothy Chandler Pavilion in Los Angeles, with Annie Hall winning Best Picture.
 April 7 – U.S. President Jimmy Carter decides to postpone production of the neutron bomb, a weapon that kills people with radiation, but leaves buildings relatively intact.
 April 9 – Somali military officers stage an unsuccessful coup against the government of Siad Barre; security forces thwart the attempt within hours, and several conspirators are arrested.
 April 14 – 1978 Tbilisi Demonstrations: Thousands of Georgians demonstrate against an attempt by Soviet authorities to change the constitutional status of the Georgian language.
 April 18 – The U.S. Senate votes, 68–32, to turn the Panama Canal over to Panamanian control on December 31, 1999.
 April 20 – A Soviet air defense plane shoots down Korean Air Lines Flight 902; the plane makes an emergency landing on a frozen lake.
 April 22
 Izhar Cohen & the Alphabeta win the Eurovision Song Contest 1978 for Israel with their song A-Ba-Ni-Bi.
 The One Love Peace Concert is held at National Heroes Stadium in Kingston, Jamaica. Bob Marley unites two opposing political leaders at this concert, bringing peace to the civil war-ridden streets of the city.
 April 25 – St. Paul, Minnesota becomes the second U.S. city to repeal its gay rights ordinance, after Anita Bryant's successful 1977 anti-gay campaign in Miami-Dade County, Florida.
 April 27
 Afghanistan's president Daoud Khan is killed, and his family murdered, during a Marxist military coup d'état; Nur Muhammad Taraki succeeds him, beginning the Afghan war which has not ended yet.
 Willow Island disaster – In the deadliest construction accident in United States history, 51 construction workers are killed when a cooling tower under construction collapses at the Pleasants Power Station in Willow Island, West Virginia.
 April 30 – The Marxist "Democratic Republic of Afghanistan" is proclaimed, under pro-communist leader Nur Muhammad Taraki.

May 
 May 4
 The Battle of Cassinga occurs in southern Angola.
 Communist activist Henri Curiel is murdered in Paris.
 May 5 – Pete Rose of the Cincinnati Reds gets his 3,000th major league hit.
 May 8
 Norway opens a natural gas field, in the Polar Sea.
 Reinhold Messner (Italy) and Peter Habeler (Austria) make the first ascent of Mount Everest, without supplemental oxygen.
 May 9 – In Rome, the corpse of former Italian prime minister Aldo Moro, is found in a red Renault 4.
 May 12 – In Zaire, rebels occupy the city of Kolwezi, the mining centre of the province of Shaba. The Zairean government asks the U.S., France and Belgium to restore order.
 May 12–13 – A group of mercenaries, led by Bob Denard, oust Ali Soilih in the Comoros; ten local soldiers are killed. Denard forms a new government.
 May 15 – Students of the University of Tehran riot in Tabriz; the army stops the riot.
 May 18
 Soviet dissident Yuri Orlov is sentenced to 7 years' hard labor, for distributing 'counterrevolutionary material'.
 Sarajevo is selected to host the 1984 Winter Olympics, and Los Angeles is selected to host the 1984 Summer Olympics.
 May 18–19 – Belgian and French paratroopers fly to Zaire, to aid the fight against the rebels.
 May 19–20 – French Foreign Legion paratroopers land in Kolwezi, Zaire, to rescue Europeans in the middle of a civil war.
 May 20 – Mavis Hutchinson, 53, becomes the first woman to run across the U.S.; her trek took 69 days.
 May 22 – Exiled leaders Ahmed Abdallah and Muhammad Ahmad return to the Comoros.
 May 25
 First Unabomber attack: A bomb explodes in the security section of Northwestern University, wounding a security guard.
 In a rematch of the previous season, the Montreal Canadiens again defeat the Boston Bruins, this time four games to two, to win the Stanley Cup.
 May 26 – In Atlantic City, New Jersey, Resorts International, the first legal casino in the eastern United States, opens.
 May 28 – Indianapolis 500: Al Unser wins his third race, and the first for car owner Jim Hall.
 May 29 – Ali Soilih is found dead in the Comoros, allegedly shot when trying to escape.

June 
 June 1 – The 1978 FIFA World Cup starts in Argentina.
 June 10 – Affirmed holds off Alydar to win the Belmont Stakes and becomes the last horse to win the U.S. Triple Crown of Horse Racing until 2015.
 June 15 – King Hussein of Jordan marries 26-year-old Lisa Halaby, who takes the name Queen Noor.
 June 19 
 England cricketer Ian Botham becomes the first man in the history of the game to score a century and take eight wickets in one innings of a Test match.
 Garfield's first comic strip, originally published locally as Jon in 1976, goes into nationwide syndication.
 June 20 – The 6.2  Thessaloniki earthquake shakes Northern Greece with a maximum Mercalli intensity of IX (Violent). Fifty people were killed.
 June 21
 A shootout between Provisional IRA members and the British Army in Northern Ireland leaves one civilian and three IRA men dead.
 1978 Iranian Chinook shootdown: Iranian helicopters stray into Soviet airspace and are shot down.
 June 22 – Charon, a satellite of Pluto, is discovered.
 June 24 – The Gay & Lesbian Solidarity March is held in Sydney, Australia to mark the 9th Anniversary of the Stonewall riots (which later becomes the annual Sydney Gay and Lesbian Mardi Gras; later incorporating a festival).
 June 25
 Argentina defeats the Netherlands 3–1 after extra time to win the 1978 FIFA World Cup.
 The rainbow flag of the LGBT movement flies for the first time (in its original form) at the San Francisco Gay Freedom Day Parade.
 June 26 – A bombing by Breton nationalists causes destruction in the Palace of Versailles.
 June 30 – Ethiopia begins a massive offensive in Eritrea.

July 
 July 3 – The Amazon Co-operation Treaty (ACT) is signed.
 July 7 – The Solomon Islands become independent from the United Kingdom.
 July 11 – At least 217 tourists die in an explosion of a tanker-truck at a campsite in Costa Daurada, Spain.
 July 24 – In Acapulco, Mexico, Margaret Gardiner of South Africa is crowned Miss Universe.
 July 25
 Cerro Maravilla murders: Two Puerto Rican pro-independence activists are killed in a police ambush.
 Louise Brown, the world's first test tube baby, is born in Oldham, Greater Manchester, UK.

August 
 August 12 – The Treaty of Peace and Friendship between Japan and the People's Republic of China is concluded.
 August 17 – Double Eagle II becomes the first balloon to successfully cross the Atlantic Ocean, flying from Presque Isle, Maine, to Miserey, France.
 August 22 – Sandinistas seize the Nicaraguan National Palace.
 August 26 – Pope John Paul I succeeds Pope Paul VI as the 263rd Pope.

September 

 September 5 – Camp David Accords: Menachem Begin and Anwar Sadat begin the peace process at Camp David, Maryland.
 September 7 – In London, UK, a poison-filled pellet, supposedly injected using an umbrella, fatally poisons Bulgarian defector Georgi Markov; he dies four days later.
 September 8 – Iranian Army troops open fire on rioters in Tehran, killing 122, wounding 4,000.
 September 12 – The Declaration of Alma Ata is signed and released in the Capital City of Kazakh, USSR. Known as the core document on Primary Health Care Practices and Equity in Healthcare, it paved the way for the modern-day State-sponsored Healthcare System.
 September 16
 General Muhammad Zia-ul-Haq officially assumes the post of President of Pakistan.
 The 7.4  Tabas earthquake affects the city of Tabas, Iran with a maximum Mercalli intensity of IX (Violent). At least 15,000 people were killed.
 September 17 – The Camp David Accords are signed between Israel and Egypt.
 September 19
 Police in the West Midlands of England launch a massive murder hunt, when 13-year-old newspaper boy Carl Bridgewater is shot dead after disturbing a burglary.
 The Solomon Islands join the United Nations.
 September 20 – General Rahimuddin Khan assumes the post of Martial Law Governor of Balochistan.
 September 23 – California Angels outfielder Lyman Bostock is shot to death at age 27 while visiting friends in Gary, Indiana during an Angels' road trip in Chicago, Illinois.
 September 24
 PSA Flight 182, a Boeing 727, collides with a small private airplane and crashes in San Diego, California; 144 are killed.
 Giuseppe Verdi's opera Otello makes its first appearance on Live from the Met, in a complete production of the opera starring Jon Vickers. This is the first complete television broadcast of the opera in the U.S. since the historic 1948 one.
 September 27 – The last Forest Brother guerrilla movement fighter is discovered and killed in Estonia.
 September 28 – Pope John Paul I dies after only 33 days of papacy.
 September 30 – Finnair Flight 405 aircraft is hijacked by Aarno Lamminparras in Oulu, Finland.
 September – Attempted poisoning of 500 members of the African National Congress by South African government infiltrators.

October 
 October 1
 Vietnam attacks Cambodia.
 Tuvalu becomes independent from the United Kingdom.
 October 7 – Wranslide in New South Wales: the Wran government is re-elected with an increased majority.
 October 8 – Australia's Ken Warby sets the current world water speed record of 317.6 mph (511.13 km/h) at Blowering Dam, Australia.
 October 9 – P.W. Botha succeeds John Vorster as Prime Minister of South Africa.
 October 10
 Daniel arap Moi becomes president of Kenya.
 John Vorster becomes State President of South Africa.
 A massive short circuit in Seasat's electrical system ends the satellite's scientific mission.
 United States President Jimmy Carter signs a bill that authorizes the minting of the Susan B. Anthony dollar.
 October 13 – The Soviet Union launches a major Russification campaign throughout all union republics.
 October 14 – U.S. President Jimmy Carter signs a bill into law which allows homebrewing of beer in the United States.
 October 16 – Pope John Paul II succeeds Pope John Paul I as the 264th pope, resulting in the first Year of Three Popes since 1605. He is the first Polish pope in history, and the first non-Italian pope since Pope Adrian VI (1522–1523).
 October 18 – Thorbjörn Fälldin steps down as Prime Minister of Sweden, and is succeeded by Ola Ullsten, the Leader of the liberal People's Party ("Folkpartiet").
 October 20 – The first Sydney Gay and Lesbian Mardi Gras is held as a protest march and commemoration of the Stonewall riots.
 October 21 – Australian civilian pilot Frederick Valentich vanishes in a Cessna 182 Skylane over the Bass Strait south of Melbourne, after reporting contact with an unidentified aircraft.
 October 27 – Egyptian President Anwar Sadat and Israeli Prime Minister Menachem Begin win the Nobel Peace Prize for their progress toward achieving a Middle East accord.
 October 31 – The South African Railways sets a still unbeaten world rail speed record on Cape gauge.

November 
 November 2: 8:00 pm – The Republic of Ireland's second television channel RTÉ 2 goes on air (renamed Network 2, 1988; RTÉ Network Two, 1995; N2, 1997; and RTÉ Two in 2004).
 November 3 – Dominica gains its independence from the United Kingdom.
 November 7 – Indira Gandhi is re-elected to the Indian parliament.
 November 18 – Jonestown incident: In Guyana, Jim Jones leads his Peoples Temple cult in a mass murder–suicide that claims 918 lives in all, 909 of them at Jonestown itself, including over 270 children. Congressman Leo J. Ryan is assassinated by members of Peoples Temple shortly beforehand.
 November 24 – China starts an experimental "household responsibility system", in Anhui Province.

December 
 December 4 – Dianne Feinstein succeeds the murdered George Moscone, to become the first woman mayor of San Francisco; she will remain in office until January 8, 1988.
 December 6 – The Spanish Constitution officially restores the country's democratic government.
 December 11
 Lufthansa heist: Six men rob a Lufthansa cargo facility in New York City's John F. Kennedy International Airport.
 Two million demonstrate against the Shah in Iran.
 December 16
 Train 87 from Nanjing to Xining collides with train 368 from Xi'an to Xuzhou near Yangzhuang railway station in China, killing 106, injuring 218.
 The Mystery of Mamo is released in cinemas in Japan.
 December 19 – Former Prime Minister of India Indira Gandhi is arrested and jailed for a week for breach of privilege and contempt of parliament.
 December 22
 The pivotal Third Plenum of the 11th National Congress of the Chinese Communist Party is held in Beijing, with Deng Xiaoping reversing Mao-era policies to pursue a program for Chinese economic reform.
 Chicago serial killer John Wayne Gacy, who was subsequently convicted of the murder of 33 young men and boys committed between 1972 and 1978, is arrested.
 Argentina begins Operation Soberanía against Chile, but Argentinian forces quickly withdraw.
 December 25 – Vietnam launches a major offensive against the Khmer Rouge of Cambodia.
 December 27 – The Constitution of Spain is approved in a referendum, officially ending 40 years of military dictatorship.

Date unknown 
 Synthetic insulin is developed.
 Romanian painter Doina Bumbea is abducted by the North Korean government.
 Abortion is legalized in Italy for the first time.
 In Seoul, South Korea, construction begins on Seoul Subway Line 2.
 Ford initiates a recall for the Pinto because of a public outcry resulting from deaths associated with gas tank explosions.
 Rolnicka Praha children's choir is founded in Prague, Czech Republic.
 The New York International Bible Society's New International Version of the complete Bible translated into modern American English is published.
 The Space Invaders arcade video game is released by Taito.

Births

January 
 January 1 – Philip Mulryne, Northern Irish footballer
 January 2 – Karina Smirnoff, Ukrainian-American dancer
 January 3
 Liya Kebede, Ethiopian model, clothing designer and actress
 Park Sol-mi, South Korean actress
 January 4 – Karine Ruby, French snowboarder (d. 2009)
 January 5
 Franck Montagny, French Formula One driver
 January Jones, American actress
 January 7 – Emilio Palma, Argentine citizen, first human born in Antarctica
 January 9
 Chad Johnson, American football player
 AJ McLean, American singer 
 Gennaro Gattuso, Italian football player
 January 10 – Kanako Mitsuhashi, Japanese voice actress
 January 11 – Emile Heskey, English footballer
 January 12 – Hannah Gadsby, Australian comedian
 January 13
 Ashmit Patel, Indian actor
 Mohit Sharma Indian Army Officer
 January 14 
 Shawn Crawford, American sprinter
 Costi Ioniță, Romanian musician and producer
 January 15
 Eddie Cahill, American actor
 Franco Pellizotti, Italian cyclist
 January 17 – Ricky Wilson, British vocalist (Kaiser Chiefs)
 January 18
 Thor Hushovd, Norwegian cyclist
 Katja Kipping, German politician
 January 20 – Omar Sy, French actor and comedian
 January 24
 Mark Hildreth, Canadian actor and voice actor
 Nami Miyahara, Japanese voice actress and singer
 Kristen Schaal, American actress, comedian, and writer
 January 25 – Volodymyr Zelenskyy, Ukrainian politician and comedian, President of Ukraine
 January 28
 Gianluigi Buffon, Italian footballer
 Jamie Carragher, English footballer
 Papa Bouba Diop, Senegalese footballer (d. 2020)
 Sheamus, Irish professional wrestler
 Vanessa Villela, Mexican actress

February 
 February 2
 Nelson Chamisa, Zimbabwean politician
 Barry Ferguson, Scottish footballer and coach
 Bárbara Mori, Uruguayan-born Mexican actress and model
 February 3 
 Joan Capdevila, Spanish footballer
 Amal Clooney, British-Lebanese barrister, activist and author
 February 4 – Danna García, Colombian actress and model
 February 5
 Brian Russell, American football player
 Samuel Sánchez, Spanish road bicycle racer
 February 6
 Danny Buderus, Australian rugby league player
 Olena Zelenska, Ukrainian first lady and former model
 Yael Naim, Israeli-French singer and songwriter
 February 7
 Omotola Jalade Ekeinde, Nigerian actress, singer, philanthropist and former model
 Ashton Kutcher, American actor
 Ivan Leko, Croatian football player and coach
 Daniel Van Buyten, Belgian footballer
 February 10
 Isabella Eklöf, Swedish screenwriter and film director
 Don Omar, Puerto Rican singer and actor
 February 12
 Gethin Jones, Welsh television presenter
 Silver Meikar, Estonian politician
 February 13 – Niklas Bäckström, Finnish hockey player
 February 14
 Richard Hamilton, American basketball player
 Danai Gurira, American actress and playwright
 Darius Songaila, Lithuanian basketball player
 February 16
 Tia Hellebaut, Belgian athlete
 John Tartaglia, American actor
 Yekaterina Volkova, Russian middle distance runner
 February 17 – Ashton Holmes, American actor
 February 18 
 Myriam El Khomri, French politician
 Josip Šimunić, Croatian football player and coach
 February 19
 Kenyatta Wright, American football player
 Immortal Technique, Peruvian-American rapper
 February 20
 Jakki Degg, English model and actress
 Julia Jentsch, German actress
 Ken Takeuchi, Japanese voice actor
 February 21
 Kim Ha-neul, South Korean actress
 Kumail Nanjiani, Pakistani-American actor and comedian
 Miki Sakai, Japanese actress
 February 22 – Jenny Frost, English singer
 February 23 – Dan Snyder, Canadian hockey player (d. 2003)
 February 24 – Gary, South Korean musician, entertainer
 February 25 – Yuji Nakazawa, Japanese footballer
 February 27 
 Kakha Kaladze, Georgian footballer and politician, Mayor of Tbilisi
 Adam Kinzinger, American politician and political commentator
 February 28
 Jeanne Cherhal, French singer-songwriter
 Yasir Hameed, Pakistani cricketer
 Benjamin Raich, Austrian skier

March 
 March 1
 Jensen Ackles, American actor
 Liya Kebede, Ethiopian model and fashion designer
 Sakura Nogawa, Japanese voice actress
 March 2
 Tomáš Kaberle, Czech hockey player
 Sebastian Janikowski, American football player
 March 3 – Tanishaa Mukerji, Indian actress
 March 4 – Denis Dallan, Italian rugby union footballer
 March 6
 Sage Rosenfels, American football player
 Mike Jackson, American politician
 March 7
 Mike Reese, American politician (d. 2021)
 Azis, Bulgarian singer
 March 10 – Benjamin Burnley, American musician
 March 11
 Didier Drogba, Ivorian footballer
 Ha Jung-woo, South Korean actor and director
 March 12
 Neal Obermeyer, American editorial cartoonist
 Claudio Sanchez, American writer and musician
 March 13
 Tom Danielson, American cyclist
 Kenny Watson, American football player
 March 14
 Pieter van den Hoogenband, Dutch swimmer
 Carl Johan Bergman, Swedish biathlete
 Moon Hee-joon, Korean singer
 March 15 – Flavio Furtado, Cape Verdean boxer
 March 16
 Matthew Montgomery, American actor
 Brooke Burns, American fashion model and actress
 March 17 
 Pilar Rubio, Spanish reporter and TV presenter
 Patrick Seitz, American voice actor
 March 18 
 Fernandão, Brazilian footballer (d.2014)
 Antonio Margarito, Mexican-American boxer
 Yoshie Takeshita, Japanese volleyball player
 March 19 – Lenka, Australian singer and actress
 March 21 – Rani Mukerji, Indian actress
 March 22
Josh Heupel, American football player and coach
Vanessa Senior, Venezuelan comedian and actress.
 March 23
 Nicholle Tom, American actress
 Perez Hilton, American actor and blogger
 March 24 – Tomáš Ujfaluši, Czech footballer
 March 29 – Igor Rakočević, Serbian basketball player

April 
 April 2 – Nick Berg, American businessman (d. 2004)
 April 3
 Matthew Goode, English actor
 Tommy Haas, German tennis player
 John Smit, South African rugby union player
 April 4 – Sam Moran, Australian singer
 April 5
 Franziska van Almsick, German swimmer
 Arnaud Tournant, French track cyclist  
 Stephen Jackson, American basketball player
 April 6
 Tim Hasselbeck, American football player
 Myleene Klass, English singer, pianist, and model
 Martín Méndez, Uruguayan musician and songwriter
 Lauren Ridloff, African-American actress
 April 7
 Duncan James, English singer
 Adrienne Haan, German-Luxembourgish actress, singer, writer and producer
 April 9
 Jorge Andrade, Portuguese footballer
 Takashi Ohara, Japanese voice actor
 Rachel Stevens, English singer
 April 10 – Rokhaya Diallo, French writer and filmmaker
 April 12
 Guy Berryman, Scottish musician
 Cheeming Boey, Malaysian artist
 Riley Smith, American actor
 April 13
 Kyle Howard, American television and movie actor
 Sylvie Meis, Dutch model and television host
 Carles Puyol, Spanish footballer
 April 15 
 Luis Fonsi, Puerto Rican singer and songwriter
 Chris Stapleton, American country singer and guitarist
 April 16
 Lara Dutta, Indian actress and beauty queen
 Matthew Lloyd, Australian rules footballer
 April 17
 Juan Guillermo Castillo, Uruguayan goalkeeper
 Jason White, Scottish rugby union player
 April 19 
 James Franco, American actor
 Gabriel Heinze, Argentine football player and coach
 April 20
 Matthew Wilkas, American actor, playwright and reality television personality
 Matt Austin, Canadian actor
 Alessandro Rigotti, Italian voice actor
 April 21 – Jukka Nevalainen, Finnish drummer
 April 22
 Esteban Tuero, Argentine Formula One driver
 Manu Intiraymi, American actor
 April 23 – Tamara Czartoryski-Borbon, Spanish athlete
 April 25 – Duncan Kibet, Kenyan long-distance runner
 April 26
 Stana Katic, Canadian-American actress
 Shinnosuke Tachibana, Japanese voice actor
 April 28  
 Robert Oliveri, American former actor
 Roman Karmen, Soviet war camera-man and film director
 April 29
 Bob and Mike Bryan, American doubles tennis team
 Tyler Labine, Canadian actor

May 
 May 4 – Daisuke Ono, Japanese voice actor
 May 6
 Tony Estanguet, French slalom canoeist
 Aleksandr Fyodorov, Russian bodybuilder
 May 8 – Lúcio, Brazilian footballer
 May 10 – Kenan Thompson, African-American actor and comedian
 May 11
 Laetitia Casta, French supermodel and actress
 Judy Ann Santos, Filipino actress
 May 12
 Hossein Rezazadeh, Iranian weightlifter
 Jason Biggs, American actor
 Aya Ishiguro, Japanese singer, writer, and fashion designer
 Malin Åkerman, Swedish-Canadian actress
 May 13 – Barry Zito, American baseball player
 May 14 – Elisa Togut, Italian volleyball player
 May 15
 Dwayne De Rosario, Canadian footballer
 Caroline Dhavernas, French-Canadian actress
 Krzysztof Ignaczak, Polish volleyball player
 May 16 – Lionel Scaloni, Argentine football coach and former football player
 May 18 
 Ricardo Carvalho, Portuguese footballer
 Cindy Parlow Cone, American soccer player
 May 19 – Marcus Bent, English footballer ***
 May 22
 Katie Price (Jordan), English model and television personality
 Ginnifer Goodwin, American actress
 May 25 – Adam Gontier, Canadian singer
 May 28
 Jake Johnson, American actor and comedian
 Tomohiko Ito, Japanese footballer
 May 29 
 Pelle Almqvist, Swedish singer-songwriter
 Sébastien Grosjean, French tennis player
 May 30 – Lyoto Machida, Brazilian mixed martial artist
 May 31 – Sara Duterte, 15th Vice President of the Philippines

June 
 June 1 – Antonietta Di Martino, Italian high-jumper
 June 2
 Nikki Cox, American actress
 Justin Long, American actor
 June 4 – Simone Maludrottu, Italian boxer
 June 5 – Nick Kroll, American actor and comedian
 June 6
 Konstantīns Konstantinovs, Latvian powerlifter (d. 2018)
 Mariana Popova, Bulgarian singer
 Judith Barsi, American child actress (d. 1988)
 June 7 
 Mini Andén, Swedish model
 Bill Hader, American actor and comedian
 June 8
 Maria Menounos, American actress, journalist, and television presenter
 Eun Ji-won, South Korean rapper and singer
 June 9
 Michaela Conlin, American actress
 Miroslav Klose, German footballer
 Matt Bellamy, British musician and singer
 June 10
 Han Hee-won, South Korean golfer
 DJ Qualls, American actor, producer, and model
 Shane West, American actor
 June 11 – Joshua Jackson, Canadian actor
 June 13 – Faizal Yusof, Malaysian actor (d. 2011)
 June 14 – Nikola Vujčić, Croatian basketball player and team manager of Maccabi Tel Aviv
 June 15 – Wilfred Bouma, Dutch footballer
 June 16 
 Daniel Brühl, German actor
 Fish Leong, Malaysian singer
 June 18 – Tara Platt, American actress and author
 June 19
 Mía Maestro, Argentine actress
 Dirk Nowitzki, German basketball player
 Zoe Saldaña, American actress
 June 20 – Frank Lampard, English footballer
 June 21
 Erica Durance, Canadian actress
 Jean-Pascal Lacoste, French singer, actor and television host
 Ignacio Corleto, Argentine rugby union player
 June 22
 Tim Driesen, Belgian actor and singer-songwriter
 Dan Wheldon, English racing driver (d. 2011)
 June 23
 Gladys Reyes, Filipino actress
 Frédéric Leclercq, French musician
 June 24
 Emppu Vuorinen, Finnish musician
 Juan Román Riquelme, Argentine footballer
 Shunsuke Nakamura, Japanese footballer
 June 25
 Aramis Ramírez, Dominican baseball player
 Aftab Shivdasani, Indian actor
 June 26
 Daniel Constantin, Romanian politician
 Cristian Lucchetti, Argentine footballer
 June 28 – Ha Ji-won, South Korean actress and singer
 June 29
 Luke Kirby, Canadian actor
 Nicole Scherzinger, American singer
 Steve Savidan, French footballer

July 
 July 1
 Aleki Lutui, Tongan rugby player
 Liu Kwok Man, Chinese footballer
 Mark Hunter, British rower
 July 2
 Ganesh, Indian actor and television presenter
 Diana Gurtskaya, Georgian singer
 Jüri Ratas, Estonian politician and 18th Prime Minister of Estonia
 July 3
 Ian Anthony Dale, American actor
 Jesse Leach, America vocalist
 Mizuki Noguchi, Japanese long-distance runner
 July 4 – Becki Newton, American actress
 July 5
 Andreas Baum, German politician
 Nandamuri Kalyan Ram, Indian actor and film producer
 July 6
 Danil Khalimov, Kazakh Greco-Roman wrestler
 Tia and Tamera Mowry, African-American actresses
 July 7
 Chris Andersen, American basketball player
 DJ Manian, German music producer and DJ
 Misia, Japanese singer
 July 8 – Erin Morgenstern, American artist and author
 July 9
 Mark Medlock, German singer
 Linda Park, Korean-born actress
 Gulnara Samitova-Galkina, Russian middle distance runner
 July 10
 Ray Kay, Norwegian director and photographer
 Jesse Lacey, American singer-songwriter
 July 11
 Kim Kang-woo, South Korean actor
 Mattias Gustafsson, Swedish handball player
 July 12
 Topher Grace, American actor
 Michelle Rodriguez, American actress
 July 13 – Gary David, Filipino professional basketball player
 July 15
 Matt Mitrione, American mixed martial artist
 Greg Sestero, French-American actor and model
 July 16 – Ahmede Hussain, Bangladeshi writer
 July 17
 Panda Bear, American musician
 Justine Triet, French actress
 July 18
 Shane Horgan, Irish rugby player
 Virginia Raggi, Italian lawyer, politician
 Joo Sang-wook, South Korean actor
 Vladimir Tintor, Serbian film actor
 July 20
 Pavel Datsyuk, Russian ice hockey player
 Tamsyn Manou, Australian athlete
 July 21
 Josh Hartnett, American actor
 Kyoko Iwasaki, Japanese swimmer
 July 22
 A. J. Cook, Canadian actress
 Kyōko Hasegawa, Japanese model and actress
 Dennis Rommedahl, Danish footballer
 July 23 – Stefanie Sun, Singapore singer
 July 25
 Louise Brown, British citizen, first human born through in vitro fertilisation
 Gerard Warren, American football player
 July 26
 Jehad Muntasser, Libyan footballer
 Eve Myles, Welsh actress
 July 28 
 Mine Tugay, Turkish actress
 Hitomi Yaida, Japanese singer
 July 29 – Ayşe Hatun Önal, Turkish singer, actress, model and beauty pageant
 July 31
 Nick Sorensen, American football player and sportscaster
 Justin Wilson, English race car driver (d. 2015)
 Christine Wohlwend, Liechtensteiner politician
 July – Caucher Birkar, born Fereydoun Derakhshani, Kurdish-born mathematician

August 
 August 1 – Oliver Dowden, British politician
 August 3
 Mariusz Jop, Polish football player and coach
 Shanelle Workman, American actress
 August 4 – Kurt Busch, American race car driver
 August 5
 Carolina Duer, Argentine boxer
 Harel Levy, Israeli tennis player
 August 6
 Marisa Miller, American supermodel
 Freeway, American rapper
 Peng Cheng-min, Taiwanese baseball player
 Iñaki Rueda, Spanish racing strategist
 August 7
 Alexandre Aja, French director
 Vanness Wu, Taiwanese singer
 August 8
 Natsuko Kuwatani, Japanese voice actress
 Louis Saha, French footballer
 Countess Vaughn, American actress
 August 9 – Daniela Denby-Ashe, English actress
 August 10 – Agus Harimurti Yudhoyono, Indonesian politician and former military officer
 August 15
 Jennie Eisenhower, American actress
 Kerri Walsh Jennings, American beach volleyball player
 August 17
 Vibeke Stene, Norwegian rock singer
 Jelena Karleuša, Serbian pop singer
 August 18 – Andy Samberg, American actor and comedian
 August 20 – Noah Bean, American actor
 August 21
 Reuben Droughns, American football player
 Alan Lee, Irish footballer
 August 22
 Vitaliy Balytskyi, Ukrainian football player and manager (d. 2018)
 James Corden, British comedian and television personality
 August 23
 Kobe Bryant, American basketball player (d. 2020)
 Julian Casablancas, American singer-songwriter and musician
 August 24 – Rafael Furcal, Dominican baseball player
 August 25 – Kel Mitchell, American actor, stand-up comedian, musician, singer, and rapper
 August 26 – Amanda Schull, American actress
 August 27 – Suranne Jones, English actress
 August 28
 Pablo Echenique, Argentine born-Spanish politician
 Kelly Overton, American actress
 Sam Wills, New Zealand comic
 August 29 – Danielle Hampton, Canadian actress
 August 31
 Ido Pariente, Israeli mixed martial artist
 Jennifer Ramírez Rivero, Venezuelan model and businesswoman (d. 2018)

September 
 September 2 – Tatiana Okupnik, Polish singer and composer
 September 3 – Tinkara Kovač, Slovenian singer and musician
 September 4
 Wes Bentley, American actor
 Frederik Veuchelen, Belgian cyclist
 September 5 - Chris Hipkins, New Zealander politician, Prime Minister-elect
 September 6
 Mathew Horne, English actor
 Homare Sawa, Japanese footballer
 September 7 – Devon Sawa, Canadian actor
 September 9 – Gina Gogean, Romania artistic gymnast
 September 11
 Ed Reed, American football player
 Ben Lee, Australian singer
 Else-Marthe Sørlie Lybekk, Norwegian handball player
 Dejan Stanković, Serbian football player and coach
 September 12
 Ruben Studdard, American singer
 Ben McKenzie, American actor
 September 13
 Megan Henning, American actress
 Swizz Beatz, American record producer and rapper
 September 14
 Ben Cohen, English rugby union player
 Ron DeSantis, American politician, 46th Governor of Florida
 Carmen Kass, Estonian supermodel
 Silvia Navarro, Mexican actress
 September 15 – Eiður Guðjohnsen, Icelandic football player
 September 16 – Stephanie Murphy, American politician
 September 18 – Billy Eichner, American actor and comedian
 September 19 
 Ramin Karimloo, Iranian born-Canadian actor and musician
 Mariano Puerta, Argentine tennis player
 September 20
 Jason Bay, Canadian baseball player
 Patrizio Buanne, Italian singer
 Sarit Hadad, Israeli pop singer
 September 21
 Doug Howlett, New Zealand rugby union player
 Josh Thomson, American mixed martial artist
 September 22 – Harry Kewell, Australian footballer
 September 23
 Anthony Mackie, American actor
 Worm Miller, American screenwriter, director and actor
 Keri Lynn Pratt, American actress
 September 24 – Wietse van Alten, Dutch archer
 September 25
 Jodie Kidd, English model
 Rossif Sutherland, Canadian actor
 September 27 – Ani Lorak, Ukrainian singer
 September 28 
Dane Boedigheimer, American Internet personality
Pastora Soler, Spanish singer
 September 29 – Kurt Nilsen, Norwegian singer
 September 30 – Candice Michelle, American professional wrestler and model

October 
 October 1 – Katie Aselton, American actress
 October 2 – Ayumi Hamasaki, Japanese singer
 October 3
 Jake Shears, American singer and songwriter
 Claudio Pizarro, Peruvian footballer
 Gerald Asamoah, German footballer
 Christian Coulson, English actor
 Shannyn Sossamon, American actress
 October 4
 Dana Davis, American actress
 Mark Day, Canadian actor
 Phillip Glasser, American actor and producer
 Kei Horie, Japanese actor
 October 5
 Shane Ryan, Irish Gaelic footballer
 James Valentine, American musician
 Morgan Webb, television personality
 October 6 
 Pamela David, Argentine TV presenter, model and actress
 Victoria Spartz, Ukrainian born-American politician
 October 7 
 Alesha Dixon, English singer and model
 Omar Benson Miller, American actor
 October 9 – Nicky Byrne, Irish musician (Westlife)
 October 10 
 Caroline Evers-Swindell, New Zealand sailor
 Georgina Evers-Swindell, New Zealand sailor
 October 14
 Paul Hunter, English snooker player (d. 2006)
 Usher, American singer and actor
 October 15 – Boško Balaban, Croatian footballer
 October 17 
 Isabel Díaz Ayuso, Spanish politician
 Pablo Iglesias Turrión, Spanish politician
 October 20
 Tomohiko Ito, Japanese anime director
 Michael Johns, Australian singer (d. 2014)
 Kira, German singer
 Dionne Quan, American voice actress
 Virender Sehwag, Indian cricketer
 October 21 – Joey Harrington, American football player
 October 24 – Carlos Edwards, Trinidadian footballer
 October 25
 Russell Anderson, Scottish footballer
 Zachary Knighton, American actor
 David T. Little, American composer and drummer
 October 26 
 Eva Kaili, Greek politician
 CM Punk, American professional wrestler
 October 27
 David Walton, American actor
 Vanessa-Mae, Singaporean violinist
 October 28
 Gwendoline Christie, English actress and model
 Byron Donalds, American politician
 Marta Etura, Spanish actress
 Justin Guarini, American singer
 October 29 – Travis Henry, American football player
 October 30 – Matthew Morrison, American actor and singer

November 
 November 1
 Jessica Valenti, American blogger and writer
 Manju Warrier, Indian actress
 Mary Kate Schellhardt, American actress
 November 3 
 Jaime Herrera Beutler, American politician
 Tim McIlrath, American singer
 November 4 – Shaun Berrigan, Australian rugby league player
 November 5
 Bubba Watson, American golfer
 Xavier Tondo, Spanish cyclist (d. 2011)
 November 6
 Nicole Dubuc, American actress and writer
 Taryn Manning, American actress
 Sandrine Blancke, Belgian actress
 November 7
 Mohamed Aboutrika, Egyptian footballer
 Zaheer Khan, Indian cricketer
 Mark Read, English singer (A1)
 November 8 
 Moses Michael Levi Barrow (born Jamal Michael Barrow), better known by his stage name Shyne, Belizean rapper and politician
 Ali Karimi, Iranian football player
 November 9 – Sisqó, American actor and singer
 November 10
 Nadine Angerer, German footballer
 Kyla Cole, Czech model
 Diplo, American DJ and music producer
 Eve, African-American rapper
 Akemi Kanda, Japanese voice actress
 Drew McConnell, English musician 
  Destra Garcia, female Trinidadian soca singer  
 November 12 – Sharmeen Obaid-Chinoy, Pakistani journalist, activist and filmmaker
 November 13 – Hsu Wei Lun, Taiwanese actress (d. 2007)
 November 14
 Bobby Allen, American ice hockey player
 Xavier Nady, American baseball player
 November 16 
 Çağla Kubat, Turkish actress, model and windsurfer
 Santiago Peña, Paraguayan  politician and economist
 November 17
 Rachel McAdams, Canadian actress
 Reggie Wayne, American football player
Tom Ellis, British actor
 November 18
 Damien Johnson, Northern Irish footballer
 Aldo Montano, Italian fencer
 Ebru Özkan, Turkish actress
 November 19 – Mahé Drysdale, New Zealand rower
 November 22 – Karen O, American singer-songwriter and musician
 November 23 – Destin Daniel Cretton, American film director
 November 24 – Katherine Heigl, American actress
 November 25 – Shiina Ringo, Japanese singer and musician
 November 26 – Jun Fukuyama, Japanese voice actor
 November 27 
 Mike Skinner, English musician
 Radek Štěpánek, Czech tennis player
 November 28 – Ardalan Shekarabi, Swedish politician
 November 29 
 Lauren German, American actress
 Ludwika Paleta, Polish-Mexican actress
 November 30
 Clay Aiken, American singer-songwriter and author
 Gael García Bernal, Mexican actor
 Robert Kirkman, American comic book writer

December 
 December 1 – Stefan Kapičić, Serbian actor
 December 2
 Nelly Furtado, Portuguese-Canadian singer and songwriter
 Alo Kõrve, Estonian actor
 December 4 – Lars Bystøl, Norwegian ski jumper
 December 5
 Neil Druckmann, Israeli-American video game writer and programmer, founder of Naughty Dog
 Olli Jokinen, Finnish ice hockey player
 December 7
 Shiri Appleby, American actress
 Kristofer Hivju, Norwegian actor
 December 8 
 Chung-Ming Wang, Taiwan Wikipedian, politician, environmentalist and gay rights activist.
 Ian Somerhalder, American actor
 December 9 – Gastón Gaudio, Argentine tennis player
 December 10 – Summer Phoenix, American actress
 December 12 – Monica Bîrlădeanu, Romanian actress
 December 14 – Patty Schnyder, Swiss tennis player
 December 16 – Veronica Schneider, Venezuelan actress and model
 December 17
 Riteish Deshmukh, Indian actor, architect, producer and entrepreneur
 Manny Pacquiao, Filipino boxer and politician
 December 18
 Daniel Cleary, Canadian ice hockey player
 Josh Dallas, American actor
 Katie Holmes, American actress
 December 19 – Patrick Casey, American screenwriter and actor
 December 20
 Geremi, Cameroon footballer
 Jacqueline Saburido, Venezuelan-American social activist (d. 2019)
Waleed al-Shehri, 9/11 terrorist (d. 2001)
 December 21 – Shaun Morgan, South African musician and singer-songwriter
 December 22
 Edo Maajka, Bosnian rapper
 Emmanuel Olisadebe, Polish-Nigerian footballer
 Joanne Kelly, Canadian actress
 December 23
 Víctor Martínez, Venezuelan baseball player
 Estella Warren, Canadian swimmer, model, and actress
 December 24 – Yıldıray Baştürk, Turkish footballer
 December 25 
 Paula Seling, Romanian singer and radio DJ
 Jeremy Strong, American actor
 Miyuki Takahashi, Japanese volleyball player
 December 26 – Kaoru Sugayama, Japanese volleyball player
 December 28 
 Feng Kun, Chinese volleyball player
 John Legend, African-American singer-songwriter, pianist, and actor
 Özgü Namal, Turkish actress
 December 29
 Alexis Amore, Peruvian actress, dancer, and model
 Angelo Taylor, American athlete
 LaToya London, American R&B and soul singer
 December 30
 Tyrese Gibson, African-American singer, songwriter, rapper, actor, model, and screenwriter
 Inferno, Polish musician
 December 31 – Yulia Barsukova, Russian rhythmic gymnast

Date unknown 
Hind Shoufani, poet, director, and producer, born in Beirut, Lebanon
Jen Psaki, American politician

Deaths

January 
 January 6 – Burt Munro, New Zealand motorcycle racer (b. 1899)
 January 13 – Hubert Humphrey, 38th Vice President of the United States (b. 1911)
 January 14 – Kurt Gödel, Austrian-American logician, mathematician, and philosopher (b. 1906)
 January 22 – Herbert Sutcliffe, English cricketer (b. 1894)
 January 23
 Terry Kath, American rock musician (Chicago) (b. 1946)
 Jack Oakie, American actor (b. 1903)
 January 26 – Leo Genn, English actor and barrister (b. 1905)
 January 29 – Tim McCoy, American actor (b. 1891)
 January 30 – Marie-Louise Damien, French actress (b. 1889)

February 
 February 9 – Warren King, American cartoonist (b. 1916)
 February 10 – Redento Maria Gauci, Maltese Carmelite bishop (b. 1920)
 February 11 – James B. Conant, American chemist (b. 1893)
February 15 – Ilka Chase, American actress (b. 1905)
 February 17 – Artemiy Artsikhovsky, Soviet archaeologist and historian (b. 1902)
 February 18 – Maggie McNamara, American actress (b. 1928)
 February 19 – Pankaj Mullick, Bengali composer and singer (b. 1904)
 February 24 – Alma Thomas, African American painter (b. 1891)
 February 28 – Philip Ahn, Korean-born American actor (b. 1905)

March 
 March 1 – Paul Scott, English writer (b. 1920)
 March 13 – John Cazale, American actor (b. 1935)
 March 17
 Eddie Aikau, American lifeguard and surfer (b. 1946)
 Giacomo Violardo, Italian Roman Catholic cardinal (b. 1898)
 March 19 – Gaston Julia, French mathematician (b. 1893)
 March 21 – Cearbhall Ó Dálaigh, Irish barrister, judge and 5th President of Ireland (b. 1911)
 March 22 – Isidro Ayora, 22nd President of Ecuador (b. 1879)
 March 24 – André Lallemand, French astronomer (b. 1904)
 March 31 – Astrid Allwyn, American actress (b. 1905)

April 
 April 8 – Lon L. Fuller, American legal philosopher (b. 1902)
 April 9 – Vivian McGrath, Australian tennis player (b. 1916)
 April 13 – Funmilayo Ransome-Kuti, Nigerian suffragist and women's rights activist (b. 1900)
 April 16
 Lucius D. Clay, American military governor of Germany after World War II (b. 1897)
 Philibert Tsiranana, Malagasy leader and politician, 1st President of Madagascar (b. 1912)
 April 18 – Katherine Schmidt, American artist (b. 1899)
 April 21 – Sandy Denny, British singer-songwriter (b. 1947)
 April 27 
 Ralston Crawford, American abstract painter, lithographer, and photographer (b. 1906)
 John Doeg, American tennis player (b. 1908)

May 
 May 1 – Aram Khachaturian, Soviet-Armenian composer and conductor (b. 1903)
 May 6 – Ethelda Bleibtrey, American Olympic swimmer (b. 1902)
 May 8 – Duncan Grant, Scottish painter (b. 1885)
 May 9 – Aldo Moro, Italian Christian Democratic politician and statesman, 38th Prime Minister of Italy (assassinated) (b. 1916)
 May 13 – Alby Roberts, New Zealander cricketer (b. 1909)
 May 15 – Sir Robert Menzies, 12th Prime Minister of Australia (b. 1894)
 May 16 – William Steinberg, German-American conductor (b. 1899)
 May 17 – Armin T. Wegner, German human rights activist (b. 1886)
 May 18 – Selwyn Lloyd, Baron Selwyn-Lloyd, English politician (b. 1904)
 May 22 
 Joseph Colombo, American gangster (b. 1923)
 Aubrey Fitch, American admiral (b. 1883)
 May 26 – Tamara Karsavina, Soviet ballerina (b. 1885)
 May 27 – Jorge Icyaza, Ecuadorean novelist (b. 1906)
 May 31
 József Bozsik, Hungarian footballer (b. 1925)
 José Gonzalvo, Spanish footballer and manager (b. 1920)

June 
 June 2 – Santiago Bernabéu Yeste, Spanish footballer, player and president of Real Madrid C.F. (b. 1906)
 June 4 – Jorge de Sena, Portuguese novelist and poet (b. 1919)
 June 7 – Ronald George Wreyford Norrish, British chemist, Nobel Prize laureate (b. 1897)
 June 12 – Guo Moruo, Chinese archaeologist, historian, poet, politician, and writer (b. 1892)
 June 17 – Robert B. Williams, American actor (b. 1904)
 June 20 – Mark Robson, Canadian film director (b. 1913)
 June 24 – Ahmad al-Ghashmi, 4th President of the Yemen Arab Republic (b. 1935)
 June 27 – Josette Day, French actress (b. 1914)
 June 28 – Clifford Dupont, 1st President of Rhodesia (b. 1905)
 June 29 – Bob Crane, American actor, drummer, radio host, and disc jockey (b. 1928)

July 
 July 1 – Kurt Student, Luftwaffe general and commander of the German airborne forces during World War II. (b. 1890)
 July 3 – James Daly, American actor (b. 1918)
 July 7 – Francisco Mendes, Guinea-Bissau politician, 1st Prime Minister of Guinea-Bissau (b. 1939)
 July 10 – Abd ar-Razzaq an-Naif, 31st Prime Minister of Iraq (b. 1934)
 July 14 – Gaston Ragueneau, French athlete (b. 1881)
 July 16 – Howard Estabrook, American actor (b. 1884)
 July 17 – Thayer David, American actor (b. 1927)
 July 27 – Willem van Otterloo, Dutch conductor, cellist and composer (b. 1907)
 July 30 – Umberto Nobile, Italian aviator and explorer (b. 1885)
 July 31 – Prince Rostislav Alexandrovich of Russia (b. 1902)

August 
 August 1 – W. E. Butler, British occultist (b. 1898)
 August 6
 Pope Paul VI (b. 1897)
 Edward Durell Stone, American architect (b. 1902)
 August 19 – Emilio Núñez Portuondo, Cuban diplomat and politician, 13th Prime Minister of Cuba (b. 1898)
 August 22 – Jomo Kenyatta, Kenyan activist, politician and statesman, 1st Prime Minister of Kenya and 1st President of Kenya (b. 1894)
 August 23 – Agustín Isunza, Mexican actor (b. 1900)
 August 24 – Louis Prima, Italian-born American singer and actor (b. 1910)
 August 25
 Olivier Hussenot, French actor (b. 1913)
 George E. Jonas, American philanthropist (b. 1897)
 August 26
 Charles Boyer, French actor (b. 1899)
 José Manuel Moreno, Argentine football player (b. 1916)
 August 28
 Kofi Abrefa Busia, Ghanese nationalist leader, 2nd Prime Minister of Ghana (b. 1913)
 Robert Shaw, British actor (b. 1927)

September 
 September 3 – Karin Molander, Swedish actress (b. 1889)
 September 4 – Leonora Cohen, British suffragette and trade unionist (b. 1873)
 September 6 – Adolf Dassler, German founder of Adidas (b. 1900)
 September 7 – Keith Moon, English rock drummer (The Who) (b. 1946)
 September 8 – Ricardo Zamora, Spanish footballer (b. 1901)
 September 9
 Hugh MacDiarmid, Scottish poet (b. 1892)
 Jack L. Warner, Canadian-American film producer (b. 1892)
 September 11
 Mike Gazella, American baseball player (b. 1895)
 Valerian Gracias, Indian Roman Catholic archbishop and cardinal (b. 1911)
 Georgi Markov, Bulgarian playwright and writer (b. 1929)
 Ronnie Peterson, Swedish Formula One driver (b. 1944)
 Curtis Shake, American jurist (b. 1887)
 September 12 – Frank Ferguson, American actor (b. 1899)
 September 15 – Willy Messerschmitt, German aircraft designer and manufacturer (b. 1898)
 September 21 – Peter Vogel, German film actor (b. 1937)
 September 23 – Lyman Bostock, American baseball player (b. 1950)
 September 24 – Hasso von Manteuffel, German army general (b. 1897)
 September 26 – Manne Siegbahn, Swedish physicist, Nobel Prize laureate (b. 1886)
 September 27 – Sergei Aslamazyan, Soviet composer (b. 1897)
 September 28 – Pope John Paul I (b. 1912)
 September 30 – Edgar Bergen, American actor and ventriloquist (b. 1903)

October 
 October 4 – Roy L. Dennis, American teenager who had craniodiaphyseal dysplasia (b. 1961)
 October 8 – Karl Swenson, American actor (b. 1908)
 October 9 – Jacques Brel, Belgian singer (b. 1929)
 October 10
 Ralph Metcalfe, American Olympic athlete (b. 1910)
 Hermes Lima, former Prime Minister and Foreign Minister of Brazil (b. 1902)
 October 11 – Ruthven Todd, Scottish poet, artist, and novelist (b. 1914)
 October 12 – Nancy Spungen, American groupie and girlfriend of Sid Vicious (b. 1958)
 October 15 – W. Eugene Smith, American photojournalist (b. 1918)
 October 16 – Dan Dailey, American actor (b. 1915)
 October 19 – Gig Young, American actor (b. 1913)
 October 21 – Anastas Mikoyan, Russian revolutionary and Soviet statesman (b. 1895)
 October 23 – Prince Roman Petrovich of Russia (b. 1896)
 October 28 – Geoffrey Unsworth, British cinematographer (b. 1914)

November 

 November 4 – Arshad al-Umari, 15th Prime Minister of Iraq (b. 1888)
 November 8 – Norman Rockwell, American artist (b. 1894)
 November 10 – Theo Lingen, German actor (b. 1903)
 November 15 – Margaret Mead, American anthropologist (b. 1901)
 November 18
 Leo Ryan, American politician (b. 1925)
 Jim Jones, American cult leader (b. 1931)
 November 20 – Giorgio de Chirico, Italian painter (b. 1888)
 November 24 – Warren Weaver, American scientist and mathematician (b. 1894)
 November 27 – George Moscone, American politician and then-mayor of San Francisco
 November 27 – Harvey Milk, American politician and activist (b. 1930)

December 
 December 3 – William Grant Still, American composer (b. 1895)
 December 7 – Alexander Wetmore, American ornithologist and avian palaeontologist (b. 1886)
 December 8 – Golda Meir, Israeli teacher, politician and stateswoman, 4th Prime Minister of Israel (b. 1898)
 December 10
 Emilio Portes Gil, Acting president of Mexico, 1928-1930 (b. 1890)
 Ed Wood, American filmmaker, actor and author (b. 1924)
 December 11 – Vincent du Vigneaud, American biochemist (b. 1901)
 December 12 – Fay Compton, English actress (b. 1894)
 December 14 – Salvador de Madariaga, Spanish diplomat, writer, historian, and pacifist (b. 1886)
 December 17 
 Don Ellis, American jazz trumpeter, drummer, composer, and bandleader (b. 1934)
 Josef Frings, German cardinal, Archbishop of Cologne (b. 1887)
 December 22 – Olaf M. Hustvedt, American admiral (b. 1886)
 December 27
 Chris Bell, American musician (b. 1951)
 Houari Boumédiènne, 2nd President of Algeria (b. 1932)
 December 31 – Nicolau dos Reis Lobato, East Timorese politician, acting President of East Timor (b. 1946)

Nobel Prizes 

 Physics – Pyotr Kapitsa, Arno Allan Penzias, Robert Woodrow Wilson
 Chemistry – Peter D. Mitchell
 Medicine – Werner Arber, Daniel Nathans, Hamilton O. Smith
 Literature – Isaac Bashevis Singer
 Peace – Anwar Sadat and Menachem Begin
 Economics – Herbert A. Simon

References